Rio Grande Credit Union Field at Isotopes Park, previously known only as Isotopes Park, is a minor league baseball stadium located in Albuquerque, New Mexico, and is the home field of the Albuquerque Isotopes of the Pacific Coast League, the Triple-A affiliate of the Colorado Rockies. The facility was also previously used by the baseball program of the University of New Mexico.

The stadium is also home to New Mexico United, a professional soccer team in the USL Championship division that began play in 2019.

History
In 2000, Bob Lozinak, then-owner of the Albuquerque Dukes, the Triple-A affiliate of the Los Angeles Dodgers, sold the team to a Portland, Oregon-based group, who moved the team to Portland as the Beavers. The Dukes had played in Albuquerque for almost 40 years. Their stadium, Albuquerque Sports Stadium, was the second oldest in the league at the time and was in disrepair.

Finding another owner and team was not difficult. The Pacific Coast League had teams in Canada that they wanted to relocate.  In 2001, a group headed by Tampa businessman Ken Young bought the Calgary Cannons with the intention of moving it to Albuquerque, contingent on building a park.  However, then Mayor Jim Baca was unable to overcome opposition from a city council reluctant to spend city money on the project.   Debate centered on whether to renovate the old Albuquerque Sports Stadium as a baseball-only park or build a brand new park downtown.  Mayor Baca put the issue to a vote and the voters easily approved the $25 million needed to finance the project.

As it turned out, the renovation of Albuquerque Sports Stadium turned into a construction of a completely new facility. Almost nothing of the old Albuquerque Sports Stadium remains, apart from the playing field. However, the new park retains its predecessor's general structure, as well as its dimensions and the system connecting the dugout to the clubhouse.  The new stadium was also intended to retain the old facility's well-known "drive-in" terrace, where fans could sit in their cars and watch the game for free.  However, Isotopes management scrapped those plans due to security concerns and instead converted it into a play area for children. Like its predecessor, it is known as a hitters park, due to the high altitude and dry air, but changes in the field were made to create more of a wind screen which allows the ball protected lift. The fences were also brought in slightly.

Isotopes Park was the home of the 2007 Triple-A All-Star Game, with the International League defeating the Pacific Coast League, 7–5. The game was viewed by 12,367 in attendance; the game was also broadcast on ESPN2 and on radio. Albuquerque's Valentino Pascucci was selected as the PCL MVP. Former Isotope Rob Stratton won the Home Run Derby.

On June 23, 2009, a single-game attendance record (since broken) was set when fans saw Manny Ramirez make a rehab start after serving a 50-game suspension for using performance-enhancing drugs.  The Isotopes defeated the Nashville Sounds 1–0.

On September 20, 2011, Isotopes Park was host to the 2011 Triple-A National Championship Game between the champions of the Pacific Coast League and the International League. The game featured the Columbus Clippers defeating the Omaha Storm Chasers, 8–3, in front of 9,569 fans.

The Isotopes set a single-game attendance record in 2018 when 16,975 fans attended a game on Cinco de Mayo as part of minor league baseball's "Copa de la Diversión" promotion, in which the Isotopes played as the Mariachis de Nuevo México.

In 2020, the Isotopes entered into a corporate naming rights agreement with Rio Grande Credit Union to rebrand the facility as Rio Grande Credit Union Field at Isotopes Park.

University of New Mexico
In 2012, New Mexico ranked 38th among Division I baseball programs in attendance, averaging 1,618 per home game.

Soccer

New Mexico United, an expansion team playing in the USL Championship, began play at Isotopes Park on March 9, 2019. The inaugural match, which finished as a 1–1 draw against Fresno FC, was attended by 12,896 fans. The record attendance for a match is 15,247, set on August 17, 2019 against Los Angeles Galaxy II.

Features
The stadium has a seating capacity of 13,279, with 11,154 fixed seats. There are 661 club seats and 30 suites at the ballpark. The field features a hill in center field, similar to the one formerly in the Houston Astros' stadium, Minute Maid Park.

The stadium has a large open breezeway above the primary seating area with a view of the playing field, which contains most of the park's services, such as restrooms, most of the food concessions, activities, and a souvenir store behind home plate. Behind the infield is the main structure of the stadium, which contains suites, offices, and the press box. An upper seating deck is attached to the structure, which overhangs the open breezeway. Beyond right field is a berm where fans can watch the game. Above the berm is a play area for children. Beyond left field is the scoreboard as well as a picnic shelter which can be reserved for groups.

Statues of Homer, Marge, Lisa, and Bart Simpson of the animated sitcom The Simpsons are located on the concourse. The 2001 episode "Hungry, Hungry Homer", in which the fictional Springfield Isotopes attempted a move to Albuquerque, was the inspiration for the real-life team's name.

Gallery

See also
 List of NCAA Division I baseball venues

References

External links

Isotopes Park – Albuquerque Isotopes Official Site
Ballpark Digest visit to Isotopes Park

College baseball venues in the United States
Baseball venues in New Mexico
Minor league baseball venues
New Mexico Lobos baseball
Soccer venues in New Mexico
Sports venues in Albuquerque, New Mexico
Sports venues completed in 2003
2003 establishments in New Mexico
Pacific Coast League ballparks